Dragan Đurić (born 20 January 1954) is a Serbian businessman, economist and former president of FK Partizan football club. He is also a president and owner of ZEKSTRA Group.

FK Partizan
On 23 July 2008 he was selected as president of FK Partizan. His predecessor was Tomislav Karadžić.

References
 Dragan Đurić

  
 

Living people
1954 births
People from Derventa
Serbs of Bosnia and Herzegovina
20th-century Serbian businesspeople
Serbian sports executives and administrators
FK Partizan presidents